Dinalo Christiano Adigo (born 25 July 1972 in Cotonou) is a former Beninese football player who now works now as head coach by FC Anker Wismar.

Career
Adigo played for Kickers Offenbach, including a DFB Pokal first round match against Hertha Berlin in 1994.

International career
He was part of the Beninese 2004 African Nations Cup team, who finished bottom of their group in the first round of competition, thus failing to secure qualification for the quarter-finals.

Coaching career
After his retirement he took the job 1 July 2007 as head coach of FC Schönberg 95 and was in his first season Vice-Champion of the 	Verbandsliga Mecklenburg-Vorpommern.

References

External links

Dinalo Adigo on Fupa

1972 births
Living people
Beninese footballers
Beninese expatriate footballers
Expatriate footballers in Belgium
Benin international footballers
Kickers Offenbach players
Expatriate footballers in Germany
Association football defenders
SSV Reutlingen 05 players
Beninese expatriate sportspeople in Germany
Association football midfielders
K.V.C. Westerlo players
Beninese expatriate sportspeople in Belgium
2004 African Cup of Nations players
Beninese football managers
People from Cotonou
Mogas 90 FC players